Alice in Wonderland is a ballet film with the Prague Chamber Ballet performing to a score by Viktor Kalabis performed by the Czech Philharmonic, based on Lewis Carroll's Alice in Wonderland and Through the Looking-Glass and the  1951 Disney film.

Scenes
 Down the looking glass
 The queen and her subjects
 Following the queen's footsteps
 The magical blackboard
 The chessboard pieces
 Alice's new friends
 The dance finale

Ballets by Viktor Kalabis
Music based on Alice in Wonderland